Cody Goloubef (born November 30, 1989) is a Canadian professional ice hockey defenceman who is currently playing for SC Bern of the National League (NL). Goloubef was selected by the Columbus Blue Jackets in the second round, 37th overall, of the 2008 NHL Entry Draft. Goloubef was selected to represent Canada at the 2018 Winter Olympics in Pyeongchang.

Playing career

Amateur
Goloubef first played minor midget hockey from 2003 to 2005 with the Toronto Marlboros in the Greater Toronto Minor Midget Hockey League. Despite his selection in the 2005 OHL Priority Selection, by the Sarnia Sting, Goloubef opted to pursue an American collegiate career en route to his path to the NHL. Playing two seasons in the Ontario Provincial Junior Hockey League with the Milton Icehawks and Oakville Blades in order to retain his collegiate eligibility, he committed to the University of Wisconsin-Madison of the Western Collegiate Hockey Association.

In his freshman season with the Badgers in 2007–08, Goloubef established himself as a regular on the blueline in contributing with 4 goals and 10 points in 40 games. Over the off-season, he was selected by the Columbus Blue Jackets in the second round, 37th overall, in the 2008 NHL Entry Draft. He played two more seasons of NCAA Division I hockey with the Badgers, announcing the end of his college career after helping Wisconsin to the NCAA Championship Game in his junior 2009–10 season.

Professional
On April 29, 2010, the Columbus Blue Jackets signed Goloubef to a three-year, entry-level contract. He was assigned by the Blue Jackets to play his first professional season in the American Hockey League with affiliate, the Springfield Falcons in the 2010–11 season. He made his debut in the season opener against the Charlotte Checkers on October 10, 2010. He completed the season, having appeared in 50 games with the Falcons, placing third on the blueline with 5 goals and notching 17 points.

In his second season with the Falcons, Goloubef was hampered from injury to appear in 48 games for 12 points. He was recalled in the final stages of the 2011–12 season by the Blue Jackets and made his NHL debut against the St. Louis Blues on March 31, 2012. During the final season of his rookie contract, Goloubef again spent time between the Blue Jackets and Falcons, appearing in 11 games and scoring his first career NHL goal, a game-winner, on February 11, 2013, in a victory over the San Jose Sharks.

On July 25, 2013, Goloubef was retained by the Blue Jackets after accepting his qualifying offer. Spending the majority of the 2013–14 season in the AHL with the Falcons, Goloubef thrust into a top four role, compiled his best offensive numbers with 28 points in 62 games. He was the Falcons' selection to the All-Star Game and featured in 5 games in Columbus.

On May 28, 2015, Goloubef was re-signed by the Blue Jackets to a one-way, two-year contract. In the 2015–16 season, his spent his first full year in the NHL with the Blue Jackets. While often a healthy scratch, he appeared in a career best 43 games as the club's rotating depth/reserve defenseman.

Having struggled to make an impact in his previous 6 seasons with the Blue Jackets, Goloubef continued the theme into the final year of his contract by missing parts of the pre-season to the start of the 2016–17 season, due to an oblique injury. After clearing waivers in October and having been surpassed the depth chart, Goloubef was reassigned to the Cleveland Monsters of the AHL. He appeared in 16 games before on he was traded by the Blue Jackets to the Colorado Avalanche in exchange for Ryan Stanton on November 28, 2016. He was initially assigned to remain in the AHL with the San Antonio Rampage appearing in 2 games before he was recalled to the Avalanche by former head coach with the Falcons, Jared Bednar. He made his Avalanche debut on December 6, 2016, against the Nashville Predators. With Colorado anchored to the bottom of the league, Goloubef remained with the club for the remainder of the season, recording his first points, two assists, with the Avalanche, in a 6–3 defeat to the Calgary Flames. Used in a depth role, Goloubef appeared in 38 games to finish with 5 assists.

On September 5, 2017, the Buffalo Sabres signed Goloubef to a professional tryout (PTO) to attend the team's training camp. He was released on September 30. He agreed to terms on an AHL contract with the Stockton Heat of the AHL. On February 25, 2018, Goloubef agreed to a two-way contract for the remainder of the 2017–18 season with parent NHL affiliate the Calgary Flames. He played out the season with the Heat, producing 20 points in 46 games from the blueline.

On July 1, 2018, Goloubef as a free agent secured a one-year, two-way contract worth $650,000 with the Boston Bruins. He was assigned to AHL affiliate, the Providence Bruins, to begin the 2018–19 season. After posting 12 points in 16 games with Providence, Goloubef was traded by Boston to the Ottawa Senators in exchange for Paul Carey on January 11, 2019.

On June 25, 2019, Goloubef signed a one-year, two-way contract extension with the Ottawa Senators. During the 2019–20 season, Goloubef appeared in 24 games for the Senators, posting one goal and one assist, before he was placed on waivers on February 20, 2020. He was claimed off waivers by the Detroit Red Wings the following day. Goloubef made 2 appearances with the Red Wings before the season was prematurely ended through the COVID-19 pandemic.

As a free agent leading into the pandemic delayed 2020–21 season, Goloubef signed a professional tryout contract in a return to the Belleville Senators of the AHL on February 4, 2021. He was later signed to a one-year, two-way contract with the Ottawa Senators on April 11, 2021.

Goloubef familiarly as a free agent was signed into the following 2021–22 season to a PTO on two occasions with the Belleville Senators. He appeared in 11 games, registering 1 goal, before he was released from his tryout and agreed to sign his first European contract for the remainder of the season with Swiss top tier club, SC Bern of the National League, on February 20, 2022.

International play

Goloubef was first introduced to the International stage as a junior, when he was selected to the gold-medal winning Canada Ontario squad for the 2006 World U-17 Hockey Challenge.

In the midst of his sophomore season the Badgers, Goloubef was selected to play for Canada at the 2009 World Junior Ice Hockey Championships, where he again won a gold medal.

Goloubef's next international visit was to represent Canada in the Spengler Cup in December 2017. From there, Goloubef once again, was asked to represent his country by joining the men's hockey team for the Winter Olympics in Pyeongchang.

Personal
Goloubef is of NHL lineage with his great uncle, Dick Duff, a six-time winner of the Stanley Cup with the Toronto Maple Leafs and the Montreal Canadiens in the 1960s, and a member of the Hockey Hall of Fame.

Career statistics

Regular season and playoffs

International

Awards and honours

References

External links
 

1989 births
Living people
Belleville Senators players
SC Bern players
Canadian ice hockey defencemen
Cleveland Monsters players
Colorado Avalanche players
Columbus Blue Jackets draft picks
Columbus Blue Jackets players
Detroit Red Wings players
Ice hockey people from Ontario
Ice hockey players at the 2018 Winter Olympics
Medalists at the 2018 Winter Olympics
Olympic bronze medalists for Canada
Olympic ice hockey players of Canada
Olympic medalists in ice hockey
Ottawa Senators players
Providence Bruins players
San Antonio Rampage players
Sportspeople from Oakville, Ontario
Springfield Falcons players
Stockton Heat players
Wisconsin Badgers men's ice hockey players